Euchomenellini is a recently (2017) restored, southeast Asian tribe of mantises.  It is now placed in the new (2019) family Deroplatyidae, genera having previously been placed in the Angelidae: which now consists only of neotropical mantises.

Genera
With the discovery of Phasmomantella, the following are included:
 Euchomenella Giglio-Tos, 1916 (Vietnam, Borneo)
 Indomenella Roy, 2008 (India) - monotypic I. indica (Ghate & Mukherjee, 2004)
 Phasmomantella Vermeersch, 2018 (Vietnam: 2 spp.)
 Tagalomantis Hebard, 1920 (Philippines)

References 

Mantodea tribes
Insects of Southeast Asia